Sherwood Christian Academy (SCA) is a private Christian school serving  kindergarten–twelfth grade students. It is run as a ministry of Sherwood Baptist Church. SCA is accredited by the Southern Association of Colleges and Schools and the Association of Christian Schools International. It is located in Albany, Georgia, United States.

Athletics 
Sherwood Christian Academy has the following sports: football, cheerleading, girls' and boys' basketball, girls' softball, baseball, soccer, track, volleyball, tennis and golf.
The Eagles have won many region titles, including Region Champions in girls' varsity soccer, boys' varsity basketball, and cross country.

References

External links 
 

Baptist schools in the United States
Christian schools in Georgia (U.S. state)
Buildings and structures in Albany, Georgia
Private high schools in Georgia (U.S. state)
Private middle schools in Georgia (U.S. state)
Private elementary schools in Georgia (U.S. state)